The Waitress (French - La Serveuse de bocks) is an 1879 oil on canvas painting by Édouard Manet. It directly relates to his Corner of a Café-Concert (National Gallery) and some art historians consider it to be a secondary version or preparatory work for Corner.

References

Paintings in the collection of the Musée d'Orsay
1879 paintings
Paintings by Édouard Manet
Food and drink paintings